Luís Miguel Silva Mendonça, known as Luís Miguel (born 24 September 1991) is a Portuguese footballer who plays for A.D. Camacha as a midfielder.

Football career
On 17 March 2013, Luís Miguel made his professional debut with Marítimo B in a 2012–13 Segunda Liga match against Freamunde, when he replaced José Tiago (58th minute).

References

External links

Stats and profile at LPFP

1993 births
People from Machico, Madeira
Living people
Portuguese footballers
Association football midfielders
C.S. Marítimo players
A.D. Camacha players
C.F. União players
Liga Portugal 2 players
Campeonato de Portugal (league) players